These are the results for the 24th edition of the Ronde van Nederland cycling race, which was held from August 21 to August 25, 1984. The race started in Breda (North Brabant) and finished in Assen (Drenthe).

Final classification

External links
Wielersite Results

Ronde van Nederland
August 1984 sports events in Europe
1984 in road cycling
1984 in Dutch sport